The Cathedral Basilica of Our Lady of Seven Sorrows is a Roman Catholic cathedral and basilica dedicated to the Blessed Virgin Mary located in Navrongo, Upper East Region, Ghana.  The basilica is the seat of the Diocese of Navrongo–Bolgatanga. The church was dedicated on May 17, 2006. The church has existed for many years and counts as one of the oldest churches in Ghana. 

Navrongo Cathedral, as it is now known, was built in 1906 and expanded in 1920. Originally called "Our Lady of Seven Sorrows", the construction was overseen by the White Fathers. The walls are of mud (therefore it is also called "Mud Cathedral"), and wooden beams form the roof. On the inside, the walls are decorated with animal forms, scenes of everyday life, and Christian themes such as the Last Supper and the Bethlehem scene in the entrance area. Inside the church there is also a tomb for bishops.

The site of the cathedral also contains a grotto and accommodation facilities.

References

External links

 https://whc.unesco.org/en/tentativelists/1393/
 http://www.ghanamuseums.org/old-navrongo-catholic-cathedral.php

Basilica churches in Ghana
Roman Catholic cathedrals in Ghana
20th-century Roman Catholic church buildings